Sparganothoides castanea is a species of moth of the family Tortricidae. It is found in Guatemala.

The length of the forewings is about 14.1 mm. The ground colour of the forewings is reddish brown basally and apically and brownish orange mesally. The hindwings are dark grey.

References

Moths described in 1913
Sparganothoides